The LGV Interconnexion Est is a French high-speed rail line that connects the LGV Nord, LGV Est, LGV Sud-Est and LGV Atlantique through suburbs of Paris. Opened in 1994, it consists of three branches, which begin at Coubert:

 west branch: towards Paris and western France, terminating at Valenton joining LGV Atlantique at Massy TGV.
 north branch: towards northern France, London and Brussels, joining the LGV Nord at Vémars
 south branch: towards southeastern France, joining the LGV Sud-Est at Moisenay

The south and west branches are now shared with the LGV Sud-Est line.

Maximum line-speed throughout is 300 km/h (186 mph).

Route
Starting from the south (LGV Sud-Est or LGV Atlantique), the line begins at Coubert junction and heads northeast. Near Tournan, there is a link to the Paris-Coulommiers line. Further north, Marne-la-Vallée – Chessy TGV station (transfer to the RER A) serves the new town of Marne-la-Vallée and Disneyland Paris theme parks. Near Claye-Souilly, two links under construction will join the line to the LGV Est. The route next serves Aéroport Charles de Gaulle 2 TGV station (transfer to the RER B and air transport). Shortly thereafter, the line joins the LGV Nord at Vémars junction.

Journey times
Lille-Roissy CDG 0:50
London - Marne-la-Vallee - Chessy TGV (for Disneyland Paris) 2:43
Lille-Lyon 2:50
Lille-Nantes 3:50
Lille-Grenoble 4:25
Lille-Marseille 4:30
Lille-Bordeaux 5:00
Brussels-Lyon 3:40
Brussels-Marseille  5:25
Brussels-Valence 4:30
Brussels-Rennes 4:50
Brussels-Montpellier 5:40

Expansion
The construction of a suburban line along the LGV between Villeparisis and Vémars is under consideration. This project could have two possible purposes: to serve Roissy airport from Paris (as an alternative to the CDG Express); or to be the beginning of a western line linking Creil to Meaux, Marne-la-Vallée and Melun.
It has also been proposed to complement the Interconnexion Est with an LGV Interconnexion Sud or LGV Interconnexion Ouest.
In November 2010, RFF began formal studies of a link from the Interconnexion Est to the Paris - Creil - Amiens line.

External links
High-speed rail lines site

See also 
 High-speed rail in France
 Paris-Charles de Gaulle Airport
 Roissy-Picardie Link

References

Interconnexion Est
Eurostar
Railway lines opened in 1994